The Supreme Court of Pakistan is the highest and apex court in the judicial hierarchy of Pakistan. Its judicial membership currently composed of the Chief Justice of Pakistan and fifteen senior justices, also consisting the ad hoc appointments of the Shariat Appellate. Advisement for nomination and necessary consultation from the Prime Minister of Pakistan, the President of Pakistan appointed the justices.

The Supreme Court was restructured in its modern form in 1956 by the Part VIII of the Constitution, which stipulates that the "judicial power of Pakistan, shall be vested in one supreme Court" together with any lower courts Congress may establish. Article 185(1) further specified the Court's original and appellate jurisdiction, created four judicial high courts, and a system of entering an appeal against punishment rendered by the high courts. The Constitution allows the Parliament to determine the fixed number of the justices, or in special cases such as when the parliamentary recess, the Constitution allows a constitutional right to fix the number of the judges.

Justices of the Supreme Court serve in the office until they attain the age of sixty-five years, unless they resign sooner or are removed from the office in accordance with the Constitution. This article focuses on the appointed justices of the Supreme Court from 1947 to the present.

List of justices

Appointments after 2007 state emergency

References

External links 
 Supreme Court of Pakistan

 
Supreme Court of Pakistan
Justices of the Supreme Court of Pakistan
Pakistan